Kurt Matlin, professionally known as KutMasta Kurt, is an American hip hop producer, best known for his work with Kool Keith, as well as occasional tracks and remixes for artists such as the Beastie Boys, Linkin Park, and Dilated Peoples.

Discography

Instrumental albums 
2010 - Funky Redneck Visits Nippon
2011 - Drum-Break Hip-Hop Vol.1
2012 - 90's Beats
2015 - Beat Tape - 1992

Collaborative albums
2000 - Kut Masta Kurt Presents Masters Of Illusion (w/ Kool Keith and Motion Man, as Masters of Illusion)
2002 - Clearing the Field (w/ Motion Man)
2004 - Diesel Truckers (w/ Kool Keith, as The Diesel Truckers)
2004 - KutMasta Kurt Presents Dopestyle 1231 (w/ MC Dopestyle and TomC3)
2007 - Kutmasta Kurt Presents Sex Style: The Un-Released Archives (w/ Kool Keith)
2007 - Ultra-Octa-Doom (w/ Kool Keith and Motion Man)
2014 - RetroMastas (w/ Retrogott)
2016 - Your Mom Is My Wife (The 1996 - 1997 Archives) (w/ Kool Keith)
2018 - Vintage Fresh (w/ Retrogott)
2021 - Microphone Deflection (w/ Moka Only as Tank Gawd)

Compilations
2004 - Redneck Games/Redneck Olympics

Notable production credits

Albums
Ultra - Big Time (1996)
Kool Keith - Sex Style (1997)
Dr. Dooom - First Come, First Served (1999)
Kool Keith - Matthew (2000)
Motion Man - Pablito's Way (2006)
Dr. Dooom - Dr. Dooom 2 (2008)

Tracks
Dr. Octagon - "Dr. Octagon" and "Technical Difficulties" from the 1996 album Dr. Octagonecologyst
Chino XL - "Deliver" from the 1996 debut album Here to Save You All
Rasco - "Take It Back Home" and "Me & My Crew" from the 1998 album Time Waits for No Man
Dilated Peoples - "Work the Angles" from the 2000 album The Platform 
Kool Keith - "Back Stage Passes" from the 2002 album Matthew
7L & Esoteric - "Rest in Peace" from the 2002 album Dangerous Connection
PMD - "Straight From the Heart" from the 2003 album The Awakening 
Planet Asia - "Paper Up (Hustler's Theme)" from the 2004 album The Grand Opening
FatHed - "What Do We Need Today?" from the 2004 album Night Train To Babble On
Kool Keith - "Grandma's Boyee" from Grandma's Boy (2006 film)
Marc Live - "This Is Street Music" from the 2007 album Validation

Remixes
Planet Asia & 427 - "Bringin' It Back (Kut Masta Kurt Remix)" from the 1999 12" Bringin' It Back
Dr. Octagon - "Blue Flowers" from the 1996 album Dr. Octagon
Chino XL - "Kreep" from the 1996 debut album Here to Save You All
Beastie Boys - "Body Movin'" from the 1998 album Hello Nasty
Blackalicious - "Deception Part3: Redemption" from the 1999 album Nia
Dilated Peoples - "No Retreat" from the 2000 album The Platform
Linkin Park - "Enth E Nd" (remix of "In the End") from the 2002 album Reanimation
Push Button Objects & Del The Funkee Homosapien & Mr. Lif - "360°" from the 2003 album Ghetto Blaster
Mos Def & Diverse - "Whylin Out" from the 2003 album Chocolate Industries
Kool Keith - "Flow Smooth" from the 2009 album Tashan Dorrsett
Lord Diamonds & Moka Only & Michael Rushden - "Change Of The Guard" from the 2013 album I Am Rich
Kool Keith presents - Tashan Dorrsett - "Basquiat" from the 2017 album The Preacher

Radio appearances
Kurt occasionally appeared as a guest DJ on Mike Nardone's "We Came From Beyond", LA's longest running hip hop radio show, which is no longer on the air.
Kurt was a frequent guest DJ on Mike Nardone & King Emz "The Joint" on LA's 92.3 the Beat . Later he filled Emz spot when he relocated to NYC.
Kurt was a frequent guest DJ on Sway & King Tech's "Wake Up Show".
Kurt was a weekly DJ for "Fat Friday's" at 90.9 KHDC Salinas, with The Verbal Tek from 1992–1994
Kurt was a weekly DJ for "The Drum" at 90.1 KZSU Stanford, with Kevvy Kev from 1988–1994
Kurt was a weekly DJ and Host for "Solid Funk" at 88.9 KUSP Santa Cruz, from 1985–1988

References
Biography on Yahoo! Music
urbansmarts Interview
Olympic Committee Forces Kutmasta Kurt To Change Album Title (AllHipHop.com)

External links

Living people
American hip hop groups
Hip hop record producers
Year of birth missing (living people)